Julius Hauser (August 7, 1854 Grand Duchy of Baden – March 26, 1920 Sayville, Suffolk County, New York) was an American businessman and politician.

Life
He came to the United States in 1869. He learned the baker's trade, and in 1878 settled in Sayville where he ran a large bakery business. From 1902 on, he was Chairman of the Democratic Committee of Suffolk County.

He was Town Clerk of Islip for several years. In 1903, he was elected Supervisor of the Town of Islip, and was still in office when he was nominated to run for New York State Treasurer in 1906 on the ticket nominated by the Democrats and the Independence League. Although William R. Hearst, the leader of the League was defeated for Governor by Charles Evans Hughes, all the other nominees were elected, and Hauser was Treasurer from 1907 to 1908. In 1908, he was defeated for re-election by Republican Thomas B. Dunn.

In May 1907, a forest fire destroyed his huckleberry farm on Long Island.

He was a director of the Oystermen's National Bank of Islip.

He died of stomach cancer at his residence on Green Avenue in Sayville.

Sources
 The Dem. ticket, in NYT on September 27, 1906 (on the "ticket" appears "W. J. Hauser", but in the text the name is given correctly)
 The Ind. L. ticket, in NYT on September 30, 1906
 His campaign, in NYT on October 8, 1906
 His farm destroyed, in NYT on May 25, 1907
 The Dem. nominees, in NYT on September 17, 1908
 His father-in-law Joseph Jedlicks dead, in NYT on January 3, 1911
 Death notice in NYT on March 27, 1920
The Political Graveyard: Index to Politicians: Hathcock to Havenor at politicalgraveyard.com Political Graveyard

1854 births
1920 deaths
New York State Treasurers
Politicians from Suffolk County, New York
German emigrants to the United States
American bankers
American bakers
Deaths from stomach cancer
New York (state) Democrats
United States Independence Party politicians
Deaths from cancer in New York (state)
People from Sayville, New York